William Tracy was an American actor.

William Tracy may also refer to:

William Tracy (JP) (died 1530), English justice of the peace and early Lutheran convert
William de Tracy (died c. 1189), knight and the feudal baron of Bradninch, Devon
William Tracy (MP, died 1440), MP for Gloucestershire
William Tracy (14th-century MP), MP for Gloucestershire

See also
William Tracey, English footballer